Assaf Amdursky (born January 30, 1971) is an Israeli singer, songwriter and music producer.

Music career
Amdursky began his career in Israel with the band "Taarovet Escot", which also included Amir "Jango" Rusianu and Yirmi Kaplan. Together they released one album in 1991. The band soon broke up, and all of its members pursued solo careers. His first eponymous solo album was released in 1994. He wrote and composed most of the songs on it. In it he played guitar, keyboards, percussion, bass, harmonica, and trumpet, and collaborated with Karni Postel, Vered Klepter, Jonnie , as well as his bandmates from Taarovet Escot. It yielded the hits Yekirati (My Darling")and Ahava Khadasha (New Love). The album was re-mastered and re-released with bonus tracks in 2008.

His second album, also eponymous, was released in 1996. On it he experimented with more keyboard-oriented arrangements and longer tracks. The songs Hashamayim Hakkhulim (The Blue Sky) and Hu He'emin La (He Believed Her) became hits. In 1999 Amdursky published his album Menoim Shketim (Silent Engines) with the hit songs 15 minutes and Khalom Kehe, which featured a recorded monologue of the late musician Inbal Perlmuter. The album went gold. It also included a duo with Eviatar Banai in the closing song Ahava... (Love...). During the mid-1990s, Amdursky moved to the United States to pursue a DJ and dance music production career. He teamed up with Friburn & Urik to produce a remix for their debut single "You Got My Love" on Sub Culture Records.With production partner Omri Anghel, he formed "Hard Attack." The duo released their first single on the Jellybean Recordings Label, "Set Me Free", which immediately climbed its way up to the top-20 Billboard Dance Music chart.

From 1999 to 2002, Amdursky released a number of remixes and original tracks as a producer, in collaboration with Israeli producer Haim Laroz. Back in Israel, Amdursky released a live album in 2000, which documents a live show with a new electronic version to his earlier songs. In 2000 he was awarded the Israeli Singer of the Year award (the Tamuz Prize), and the Album of the Year award for Silent Engines.

In 2005, he produced Kadima Akhora (Forth and Back) – a double cover album, which interprets 1980s Israeli songs with a touch of electronic music.

Amdursky's self-released studio album Harei At (Thou Art), released in 2008, also went gold. It combined 11 new rock, pop, and jazz style songs, all dealing with love and partnerships.

His next album Tsad Alef (Side A) was released in 2011, and included one song with lyrics by David Avidan, and collaborations with guest singers Tom Darom, Rona Kenan and Karni Postel.

Amdursky also worked as the music producer on the movies Nina's Tragedies (2003), Ahava Columbianit (2004), and Lost Islands (2008). For the latter he received the Ophir Award.

In 2019, he performed as part of the "Menashe Forests" festival alongside Ella Ronen, Abigail Kovari, and others.

Personal life
Amdursky's father, Benny Amdursky (1931–1994), was a great Israeli singer and producer. Amdursky was married for 12 years to singer-songwriter Michal Amdursky, who came out with a solo album after her divorce from Amdursky. The divorce is the subject of some of the songs on her album, in which she sings of emerging finally from her ex-husband's shadow.

References

External links

Assaf Amdursky; CD Baby
Interview with Assaf Amdursky (German)

1971 births
Living people
20th-century Israeli male singers
Israeli pop singers
21st-century Israeli male singers